Hexachloroacetone is an organic compound with the formula (Cl3C)2CO. It is also called hexachloropropanone or perchloroacetone. Numbers indicating the position of the chlorine-atoms are generally omitted as all the possible positions are substituted with chlorine. It is a colorless liquid, slightly soluble in water.

Reactions and uses
Hexachloroacetone functions equivalently to trichloroacetyl chloride, i.e. as an trichloroacetylating agent.

The main use of hexachloroacetone is as a pesticide. For the use of hexachloroacetone in the preparation of a novel insect repellent see Perkow reaction. The industrial route to hexafluoroacetone involves treatment of hexachloroacetone with HF:
(CCl3)2CO  +  6 HF   →   (CF3)2CO  +  6 HCl

See also
 Chloroacetone
 Dichloroacetone

References

Organochlorides
Ketones
Pesticides